Kureji-ohike Dam  is a gravity dam located in Hiroshima Prefecture in Japan. The dam is used for irrigation. The catchment area of the dam is 0.7 km2. The dam impounds about 2  ha of land when full and can store 63 thousand cubic meters of water. The construction of the dam was started on 1955 and completed in 1958.

References

Dams in Hiroshima Prefecture